Ecyroschema favosum is a species of beetle in the family Cerambycidae. It was described by Thomson in 1864. It is known from South Africa, the Ivory Coast, the Democratic Republic of the Congo, Tanzania, Namibia, Uganda, Sudan, and Zimbabwe. It feeds on Acacia. It contains the varietas Ecyroschema favosum var. rhodesianum.

References

Crossotini
Beetles described in 1864